Todd Williams III (born September 11, 1977) is an American actor best known for his role as Officer Isaac Joiner on the crime drama television series The Chicago Code.

Early life
Born in Queens, New York, Williams began the pursuit of his acting career while attending Talent Unlimited High School in Manhattan. Concerned about having a backup plan, he chose to explore another one of his artistic passions after graduating, and applied himself to the course study of Music Business at New York University. Not satisfied, Williams subsequently left NYU to focus on his acting career goals full-time.

Career
After booking several national commercial and voice-over spots, he made his film debut opposite Kerry Washington in the critically acclaimed feature Lift. Several television appearances followed on shows such as Law & Order: SVU and The Twilight Zone. In 2004, while recurring on Third Watch, Williams booked a role alongside Michael Madsen in the ESPN original series Tilt.

After relocating to Los Angeles in 2005, he secured numerous guest leads on shows such as CSI, CSI: Miami, and the CW’s The Game. In addition, he landed another lead role with Anthony Anderson in the indie film, The Last Stand. Williams also portrayed the role of Connor Jordan in season 4 of the CW's The Vampire Diaries In 2010, after spending two seasons on the USA Network series In Plain Sight, he landed a series regular role on the Fox series The Chicago Code which premiered on February 7, 2011.

Filmography

Film and TV Movies

Television

Video Games

References

External links

Living people
Male actors from New York City
African-American male actors
American male film actors
American male television actors
People from Queens, New York
New York University alumni
21st-century American male actors
1977 births
21st-century African-American people
20th-century African-American people